Kevin Thomas (born 25 April 1975) is a Scottish former professional footballer.

Career

Early career 

Thomas began his career with Heart of Midlothian, and represented the Scotland national under-21 football team. He failed to build on an exciting early breakthrough to the Hearts first team. He had initially been seen as the new John Robertson as one of the most exciting young strikers to break through for many years. He represented Scotland at Under 21 level on many occasions. His early promise was cut short by an horrific injury which kept him out for the best part of two years – an injury which he never fully recovered from. Eventually, he was loaned to Stirling Albion in 1998 and then sold to Greenock Morton later that year. Thomas found some form at Morton, scoring 12 goals in 25 league games. Sandy Clark, Thomas' former manager at Hearts, signed Thomas for St Johnstone in August 1999 for a fee of £150,000.

Later career
Thomas had suffered a cruciate ligament injury in October 2000, which meant that he had to undergo an operation to repair the ligament. He was expected to be unavailable for the rest of the 2000–01 season. However, following a cocaine arrest in December 2000, Thomas was sacked by St Johnstone, along with team-mate George O'Boyle.

After recovering from a knee injury, Thomas signed short term deals with lower league clubs Montrose and Berwick Rangers during the 2001–02 season. After leaving Berwick, he played for Edinburgh Athletic in the East of Scotland Football League and worked for an hotel booking agency run by his mother.

References

External links

London Hearts profile
 http://www.dailyrecord.co.uk/football/spl/st-johnstone/2012/05/06/sandy-clark-on-his-struggles-to-deal-with-george-o-boyle-and-kevin-thomas-drug-scandal-at-st-johnstone-86908-23849896/
Scotland U21 stats at Fitbastats

1975 births
Association football forwards
Living people
Footballers from Edinburgh
Scotland under-21 international footballers
Scottish footballers
Heart of Midlothian F.C. players
Stirling Albion F.C. players
Greenock Morton F.C. players
St Johnstone F.C. players
Berwick Rangers F.C. players
Montrose F.C. players
Scottish Premier League players
Scottish Football League players
Bo'ness United F.C. players
Scottish Junior Football Association players
Expatriate footballers in Finland